A doubleheader is a term used by television networks to refer to two games involving the same sport that are shown back-to-back on the same network, even though the events do not involve the same two teams (three such games may be referred to as a tripleheader, this scenario occurring most frequently in regard to basketball). A doubleheader purposely coincides with a league's scheduling of "early" and "late" games. In North America, games usually start at the same time period in different time zones (Eastern and Pacific). The concept is less often extended to three games—a tripleheader—or, much more rarely, a quadrupleheader of four games.

American football

National Football League

National Football League (NFL) games played in the usually start around 1:00 p.m. or 4:00 pm Eastern Time, creating a 1:00/4:00 p.m. doubleheader in the Eastern Time Zone and a 10:00 a.m./1:00 p.m. doubleheader in the Pacific Time Zone.    

The two networks that hold the rights to broadcast NFL games on Sunday afternoons – Fox and CBS – both typically air doubleheaders during the regular season (with the other network only being permitted to broadcast one game in a specific market; each network is given eight doubleheaders to broadcast during the season, and both networks are given doubleheaders during the first and final week of the season in order for games with playoff implications to have the most exposure), with restrictions applying to some markets in which the local team is playing at home that week. When combined with the Sunday night game on NBC, this creates a tripleheader (as was sometimes advertised by the league's radio partner, Westwood One, which carried three games in a tripleheader format).

Since 2006, Week 1 of the NFL regular season also features a doubleheader on Monday Night Football (which moved from ABC to ESPN concurrent with the change), with the late-evening game involving two West Coast teams. This alleviates a quirk in the NFL television contract where there is no Monday game in the final week of the regular season in order to allow all playoff teams to have an equal number of days off between the final regular season and first playoff game.

A daytime doubleheader occurred on October 26, 2014, when Fox was given the rights to broadcast a game between the Atlanta Falcons and Detroit Lions at Wembley Stadium in London, resulting in Fox and CBS both being allocated doubleheader games on the same weekend due to the early 9:30 a.m. Eastern Time kickoff of the Falcons-Lions game, in addition to the regional games scheduled in the normal 1:00 p.m. Eastern "early" slot.
In 2015 and 2016 Fox aired an NFL tripleheader (9:30 a.m., 1:00 p.m., and 4:25 p.m. ET) followed by Game 5 of 2015/2016 World Series at 8:00 p.m. ET.

Canadian Football League
The television rightsholders to the Canadian Football League (currently, TSN) have periodically aired doubleheaders and tripleheaders, usually on Saturdays and Sundays. Two Monday doubleheaders, the Labour Day Classic and the Thanksgiving Day Classic, are among the most prominent games in the schedule and occur on two national holidays. The Labour Day Classic doubleheader features prominent rivalries (Hamilton-Toronto and Edmonton-Calgary), while the Thanksgiving Day Classic are otherwise rotated (although one is hosted by the Montreal Alouettes every year).

Doubleheaders are also used to present the division semifinal and division final weeks of the CFL playoffs.

Association football

Premier League
In the United Kingdom, Sky Sports airs doubleheader matches from the English Premier League under the banner "Super Sunday". These feature an early match with a kickoff scheduled at 2 p.m. and a late match with a 4:30 p.m. kickoff. Other matches may also be moved to Sunday, usually because one of the teams involved played in a UEFA Europa League fixture the preceding Thursday. This results in Sky Sports airing the early match with a kickoff scheduled at 2:15 p.m. and a late match with a 4:30 p.m. kick-off.

Liga MX
Mexican broadcaster Canal de las Estrellas usually airs a doubleheader on select Sundays during football season. The first game, usually a Deportivo Toluca F.C. or Pumas UNAM home game, begins at 12:00 p.m. Central Time (1:00 p.m. Eastern and 10:00 a.m. Pacific). The second game, typically a Club América home game, begins at 4:00 p.m. Central Time (5:00 p.m. Eastern/2:00 p.m. Pacific). Doubleheaders usually air when Club América and either Pumas UNAM or Deportivo Toluca F.C. are playing at their home stadium. In the United States, Univision began airing these doubleheaders in 2012.

Australian rules football

Australian Football League
In Australia, Fox Footy and Seven Network airs doubleheader matches from the Australian Football League and AFL Women's under the banner "Super Sunday". These feature an early match with a kickoff scheduled at 1:30 p.m. and a late match with a 4:00 p.m. kickoff.

National Hockey League
In Canada, Hockey Night in Canada features a doubleheader on CBC on Saturday nights during the National Hockey League (NHL) regular season. The first game, featuring teams based in Eastern Canada, begins at 7:00 p.m. Eastern (4:00 p.m. Pacific Time). The second game, featuring teams based in Western Canada, airs at 10:00 p.m. Eastern (7:00 p.m. Pacific). On some Wednesday nights, Sportsnet may air a doubleheader.

In the United States, TNT also airs doubleheaders as part of its NHL coverage, usually on Wednesday nights, in the same time slots.

National Basketball Association
The NBA currently holds two doubleheaders on Christmas afternoon (counting all broadcast outlets, it has since expanded into a quintupleheader or five consecutive national games). The league also frequently features doubleheaders on ESPN, TNT, and late in the season but less on a frequent basis, ABC. The league experimented in 2009 and 2010 with a Thanksgiving night doubleheader, but discontinued the practice after the 2011 NBA lockout.

References

National Football League on television
National Hockey League on television
Sports television